Dyesebel is a 1996 Philippine fantasy film directed by Emmanuel Borlaza. Based on a Philippine graphic novel of the same title by Mars Ravelo, the film stars Charlene Gonzales as the titular mermaid.

Cast
 Charlene Gonzales as Dyesebel
 Matthew Mendoza as Fredo
 Gloria Diaz as Banak
 Jaclyn Jose as Lucia
 Julio Diaz as Tino
 Albert Martinez as Gildo
 Kristine Garcia as Betty
 Gary Estrada as Juno
 Charina Scott as Young Dyesebel
 Maritoni Fernandez as Dyangga
 Dindi Gallardo as Bangenge
 Marita Zobel as Issa
 Romeo Rivera as Nilo
 Don Pepot as Mang Kiko
 Vivian Lorraine as Minda
 Ama Quiambao as Instructress

Production
The film was announced in 1994 with Ana Roces initially cast as the titular mermaid. However, due to her weight problems at that time, the role was later on given to Charlene Gonzales. This prompted Roces to leave Viva Films the following year.

The character portrayed by Gonzales first appeared in the 1994 film Ang Pagbabalik ni Pedro Penduko.

Release
The film was slated to be released in late January 1996. However, it was pushed back to January 4, the original release date of Ang Pinakamagandang Hayop sa Balat ng Lupa, which was having release issues in Metro Manila theaters.

References

External links

1996 films
1996 fantasy films
Filipino-language films
Philippine fantasy films
Viva Films films
Dyesebel